Transmediale, stylised as transmediale, is an annual festival for art and digital culture in Berlin, usually held over five days at the end of January and the beginning of February. Transmediale takes the form of a conference (sometimes called a festival), an exhibition, and a film and video program that often contain or support performances and workshops. Throughout the year, transmediale is also involved in a number of long- and short-term cooperative projects via transmediale/resource. From its initial focus on video culture, it came to cultivate an artistic and critical dialogue with television and multimedia, emerging as the leading international platform for media art. 

The CTM Festival, which began as a part of transmediale, has since become an independent event.

History 
Transmediale began in 1988 at Berlinale under the name VideoFilmFest by founders Hartmut Horst and video artist Micky Kwella. Horst and Kwella wanted to create a platform for electronic media productions, which were, at that time, excluded from classic film festivals such as Berlinale. In 1989, the program was repeated at Berlinale under the name VideoFest. In 1997, Horst and Kwella renamed VideoFest as transmedia, and then in 1998, transmediale. The change reflected the programmatic extension of the festival, which by then encompassed a broad spectrum of multimedia art forms such as Internet and software art. In 1999, club transmediale was founded as a side event.

In 2001, art historian and curator Andreas Broeckmann took over the artistic direction of transmediale, adding events and a new venue, the Haus der Kulturen der Welt. These changes resulted in an increase in attendance and international audience. That same year, Broeckmann introduced the transmediale Award to honour visionary works and projects centering technology-led societies. In 2002, transmediale introduced an extensive media art exhibition. Shortly thereafter, in 2004, the Kulturstiftung des Bundes (German Federal Cultural Foundation) starting funding transmediale. In 2006, the festival's subheading changed from "international media art festival" to "festival for art and digital culture" in a marked shift to include art, technology, and everyday life as opposed to its previously narrower focus on media art alone. In 2007, media and arts researcher Stephen Kovats became the artistic director of transmediale and one year later, in 2008, he introduced the Vilém Flusser Theory Award, named after Vilém Flusser, to promote "outstanding, media-theoretical and research-based artworks". In April 2011, curator and media researcher Kristoffer Gansing took over transmediale. In 2012, he replaced the existing awards with a residency program for artistic research. In an interview in Ocula Magazine, Gansing commented on the changes in direction of transmediale under his leadership: "When I first came on board ... my idea was to bring a curatorial coherency to what I saw as a festival dissipating into a kind of 'creative crowd' without much focus, so I brought in more exhibitions."

In 2021, Dr Nora O Murchú became the artistic director of transmediale, opening the festival's programme to include a notably more diverse programme in terms of scope, content, and curatorial teams (including Ben Evans James, Elise Hunchuck, Lorena Juan, Dani Admiss in 2021/22 and Bani Brusadin in 2023).

Themes 
Since 2001, transmediale has been developed and curated according to annual themes under the direction of the artistic director and the curatorial team:

transmediale.01 DIY [do it yourself!]
transmediale.02 go public!
transmediale.03 PLAY GLOBAL!
transmediale.04 FLY UTOPIA!
transmediale.05 BASICS
transmediale.06 REALITY ADDICTS
transmediale.07 unfinish!
transmediale.08 CONSPIRE...
transmediale.09 DEEP NORTH
transmediale.10 FUTURITY NOW!
transmediale.11 RESPONSE:ABILITY
transmediale 2k+12 in/compatible
transmediale 2013 BWPWAP
transmediale 2014 afterglow
transmediale 2015 CAPTURE ALL
transmediale/conversationpiece 2016
transmediale 2017 ever elusive
transmediale 2018 face value
transmediale 2019 study circles
transmediale 2020 E2E
transmediale 2021-22 for refusal
transmediale 2023 scale

Organisation 
The host organization of the festival is Kultur Projekte Berlin.

In 2011, transmediale/resource was established as a framework for transmediale's year-round activities. Its aim is to provide a sustainable structure for feedback, research, and reflection beyond the timeframe of the festival. In addition to varying cooperative projects and network activities, 

Transmediale/resource includes the Vilém Flusser Residency Program for Artistic Research, online publication format transmediale/journal and pre-festival program Vorspiel, presented in collaboration with the CTM Festival and a network of organizations, galleries, independent project spaces, and venues all over Berlin.

Places 
Until 1992, VideoFilmFest took place at MedienOperative as well as Deutsche Akademie der Künste in East Berlin. In 1993, it moved to Podewil, which is also where the transmediale offices have been located from 1997 to 2020. In 2020 the office moved to silent green Kulturquartier, where the festival also opened its own project space 'transmediale studio'. 

From 2002 to 2005, the Haus der Kulturen der Welt became the festival's main location. In 2006, transmediale relocated to Akademie der Künste, returning to the Haus der Kulturen der Welt in 2008. In addition to Haus der Kulturen der Welt, the festival edition 2021–22 took place in the transmediale studio, Kunstraum Kreuzberg/Bethanien and Betonhalle. In 2023, the festival (a map, a model, a fiction) and exhibition (Or So It Seems) took place in the Akademie der Künste, Hanseatenweg, Berlin, as well as the distributed exhibition (Out of Scale) that unfolded in networks (spatis, eBay Kleinenzeigen, and so on) across the city.

External links 

 
 transmediale 2011: Interviews by and with Stephen Kovats (videos)
 transmediale 2011: Kristoffer Gansing introduces himself (video)
 CTM Festival
 

Art festivals in Germany
Festivals in Berlin
New media art festivals
New media art
Digital art
Digital media organizations
Festival organizations in Europe
Political art
Cultural organisations based in Germany
Politics and technology
1988 establishments in West Germany
Recurring events established in 1988
Annual events in Germany